is a Japanese football player. He plays for Fagiano Okayama.

Playing career
Hiroki Yamamoto joined to J1 League club; Vegalta Sendai in 2014. In June, he moved to J2 League club; Matsumoto Yamaga FC. In 2015, he backed to Vegalta Sendai. In 2016, he moved to Matsumoto Yamaga FC again.

Club statistics
Updated to 23 February 2018.

References

External links

 
Profile at Matsumoto Yamaga

1991 births
Living people
Komazawa University alumni
Association football people from Kumamoto Prefecture
Japanese footballers
J1 League players
J2 League players
Vegalta Sendai players
Matsumoto Yamaga FC players
Fagiano Okayama players
Association football forwards